List of all members of the Storting in the period 1977 to 1981.  The list includes all those initially elected to the Storting.

There were a total of 155 representatives, distributed among the Partyes: 76 to Norwegian Labour Party,
41 to Conservative Party of Norway, 22 to Christian Democratic Party of Norway, 12 to
Centre Party (Norway),
2 to Socialist Left Party and 2 to Venstre (Norway)

Aust-Agder

Vest-Agder

Akershus

Buskerud

Finnmark

Hedmark

Hordaland

Møre og Romsdal

Nordland

Oppland

Oslo

Rogaland

Sogn og Fjordane

Telemark

Troms

Nord-Trøndelag

Sør-Trøndelag

Vestfold

Østfold

References

 
Parliament of Norway, 1977–81